Rugantino is a 1973 Italian comedy film directed by Pasquale Festa Campanile.

It is based on the stage musical with the same name by Pietro Garinei and Sandro Giovannini.

Plot summary
Rome, 1800. Rugantino is a fool in love that rages eternal, though he is very unlucky in love stories and fruitful occasions. In fact, he is denounced for trying to rob the elderly uncle of his inheritance, apparently believing that he's dying and Rugantino sentenced to public torture of a squire. Rugantino is in love with young married Rosetta, whom she appears to love because of his innocence and ineptitude. The young man is then accused of murdering a Roman nobleman and sentenced to death. His fate is sealed, and after spending a few days in jail, Rugantino is beheaded.

Cast 
Adriano Celentano: Rugantino
Claudia Mori: Rosetta
Renzo Palmer: cardinal Severini
Maria Grazia Spina: Donna Marta Capitelli
Sergio Tofano: Marquis Michele Sacconi
Toni Ucci: Don Niccolò Capitelli
Paolo Stoppa: Mastro Titta
Riccardo Garrone: prince, brother of Niccolò
Sandro Merli: Oste
Guglielmo Spoletini: Gnecco
Pippo Franco: Frascatano
Enzo Robutti: painter
Renato Baldini: nobleman
Elio Pandolfi: voce bianca
Vincenzo Crocitti: burino
Alvaro Vitali: beggar

References

External links

1973 films
Italian comedy films
1973 comedy films
Films directed by Pasquale Festa Campanile
Films scored by Armando Trovajoli
1970s Italian films
1970s Italian-language films